Robert Finn may refer to:

 Robert Emmett Finn (1877–1951), lawyer and political figure in Nova Scotia, Canada
 Robert Finn (mathematician) (1922–2022), American mathematician
 Robert Finn (1930–2011), chief music critic of The Plain Dealer, 1964–1992
 Robert Finn (diplomat) (born 1945), American ambassador to Afghanistan
 Robert Finn (bishop) (born 1953), Roman Catholic prelate, former bishop of Kansas City, Missouri